Ángel David Comizzo Leiva (born 27 April 1962) is an Argentine football manager and former player who played as a goalkeeper. He is the current manager of Peruvian club Deportivo Municipal.

Comizzo was born in Reconquista, and began his career at Talleres in the Primera Division Argentina. In 1988, he joined River Plate where he was loaned to UANL Tigres of Mexico in 1990–1991. In 1993, he moved to América de Cali in Colombia, but after a very poor performance, he returned to Argentina later that year to play for Club Atlético Banfield.

In 1996, he joined Club León in Mexico, and in 1999 he moved to team Morelia in time to be part of a championship club. In 2001 Comizzo returned to River Plate, and in 2003 he joined Atlético Rafaela where he retired from football in 2004.

In September 2009, Angel Comizzo was brought in by Carlos Reinoso to be his assistant manager for Querétaro FC. Comizzo was a huge part of Reinoso's Leon in 1997 when they lost the final against Cruz Azul in Extra Time with a golden goal.

World Cup 1990

When Nery Pumpido was injured in Argentina's second match at the 1990 World Cup finals, Comizzo was brought into the squad as a replacement. He did not actually play in any of the team's subsequent matches in the tournament.

Curse of Leon and Cruz Azul

It is said that Comizzo cursed Leon and Cruz Azul during the final of 97 by kicking Carlos Hermosillo at the last minute and causing a penalty kick that made them lose the final.

Honours

Player

Club
River Plate
Argentine Primera División: 1989–90, 1991 Apertura, 2002 Clausura, 2003 Clausura
Morelia
Liga MX: Invierno 2000

International
Argentina
FIFA World Cup Runner-up: 1990

Manager
Universitario de Deportes
Primera División de Peru: 2013

Morelia
Supercopa MX: 2014

External links
Ángel Comizzo – Argentine Primera statistics at Fútbol XXI 

1962 births
Living people
People from Reconquista, Santa Fe
Talleres de Córdoba footballers
Club Atlético River Plate footballers
América de Cali footballers
Club Atlético Banfield footballers
Argentine people of Italian descent
Argentine expatriate footballers
Expatriate footballers in Colombia
Expatriate footballers in Mexico
Atlético de Rafaela footballers
Association football goalkeepers
Argentine footballers
1990 FIFA World Cup players
Argentine Primera División players
Tigres UANL footballers
Atlético Morelia players
Club León footballers
Liga MX players
Categoría Primera A players
Argentine football managers
Expatriate football managers in Mexico
Expatriate football managers in Peru
Talleres de Córdoba managers
Querétaro F.C. managers
Club Universitario de Deportes managers
Sportspeople from Santa Fe Province
Club Deportivo Universidad César Vallejo managers
Deportivo Municipal managers